The JBL Super League was a professional basketball league in Japan. It started operations in 2001 and was disbanded in 2007, with the foundation of the Japan Basketball League.

History 
The first season of the JBL Super League was played in 2001–02, but a "Pre-Super League" was played in 2000–01. The league was played with 8 participating teams for the first seasons until 2006, when Fukuoka Red Falcons left the league. The JBL Super League was disbanded in 2007, after the 2006–07 season, and the 7 teams went on to found the Japan Basketball League.

List of champions

Teams 

The following is a list of clubs that took part in JBL Super League seasons. Teams that also participated in the 2000–01 Pre-Super League are marked with an asterisk. Teams that left the league before its final season are in italics.

 Aisin Seiki Aisin SeaHorses* (2000–07), changed name to Aisin SeaHorses in 2004
 Bosch Blue Winds* (2000–02)
 Fukuoka Red Falcons (2005–06)
 Hitachi SunRockers* (2000–07)
 Isuzu Motors Giga Cats* (2000–02)
 Matsushita Electric Panasonic Super Kangaroos* (2000–07), changed name to Panasonic Super Kangaroos in 2006
 Mitsubishi Electric Melco Dolphins* (2000–07) 
 Niigata Albirex (2002–05)
 OSG Phoenix (2002–07)
 Toshiba Red Thunders* (2000–07), changed name to Toshiba Brave Thunders in 2002
 Toyota Alvark* (2000–07)

Award winners

Most Valuable Player

Statistical leaders

Top scorers

Rebounding leaders

Assists leaders

Steals leaders

Blocks leaders

References

External links 

2001 establishments in Japan
2007 disestablishments in Japan
Basketball leagues in Japan
Sports leagues established in 2001
Sports leagues disestablished in 2007